Bob Pattinson (14 May 1933 – 2 November 1963) was an Australian rules footballer who played with North Melbourne in the Victorian Football League (VFL). In the Victorian Football League he was the 6,853rd player to appear and he was the 494th player to play in the VFL for North Melbourne.

Notes

External links 

1933 births
1963 deaths
Australian rules footballers from Victoria (Australia)
North Melbourne Football Club players